The Sykes Churches Trail is a tour of East Yorkshire churches which were built, rebuilt or restored by the Sykes family of Sledmere House in the East Riding of Yorkshire, England. The tour was devised by the East Yorkshire Historic Churches Group and is divided into a southern circuit and a planned northern circuit.

Work on the churches was financed by Sir Tatton Sykes, 4th Baronet (1772–1863) and his son Sir Tatton Sykes, 5th Baronet (1826–1913). The 4th Baronet engaged John Loughborough Pearson to work on churches at Garton on the Wolds, Kirkburn, Bishop Wilton and Hilston in Holderness. The 5th Baronet worked with the architects C. Hodgson Fowler, G.E.Street and Temple Moore. His achievements were far greater than his father's, and unparalleled elsewhere in Britain. He financed work on 17 rural churches between 1866 and 1913.

Churches of the southern circuit

These include:

Other Sykes churches

These include several churches previously in the East Riding which, after boundary changes, are now in North Yorkshire.

References

External links
East Yorkshire Historic Churches Group

Tourist attractions in the East Riding of Yorkshire
Church of England church buildings in the East Riding of Yorkshire